Mazaruni may refer to:

 Mazaruni River in Guyana
, Guyanese cargo ship